Euchlaenidia is a genus of tiger moths in the family Erebidae. The genus was erected by George Hampson in 1901.

Species
Euchlaenidia albilinea (Schaus, 1912)
Euchlaenidia erconvalda Schaus, 1933
Euchlaenidia macallia Schaus, 1933
Euchlaenidia neglecta Rothschild, 1910
Euchlaenidia ockendeni Rothschild, 1910
Euchlaenidia transcisa (Walker, 1854)
Euchlaenidia wirthi Schaus, 1933

References

External links

 
Pericopina
Moth genera